Greenwood Township may refer to:

Arkansas
 Greenwood Township, Baxter County, Arkansas, in Baxter County, Arkansas
 Greenwood Township, Poinsett County, Arkansas, in Poinsett County, Arkansas

Illinois
 Greenwood Township, Christian County, Illinois
 Greenwood Township, McHenry County, Illinois

Iowa
 Greenwood Township, Kossuth County, Iowa

Kansas
 Greenwood Township, Franklin County, Kansas

Michigan
 Greenwood Township, Clare County, Michigan
 Greenwood Township, Oceana County, Michigan
 Greenwood Township, Oscoda County, Michigan
 Greenwood Township, St. Clair County, Michigan
 Greenwood Township, Wexford County, Michigan

Minnesota
 Greenwood Township, Clearwater County, Minnesota
 Greenwood Township, St. Louis County, Minnesota

Pennsylvania
 Greenwood Township, Clearfield County, Pennsylvania
 Greenwood Township, Columbia County, Pennsylvania
 Greenwood Township, Crawford County, Pennsylvania
 Greenwood Township, Juniata County, Pennsylvania
 Greenwood Township, Perry County, Pennsylvania

South Dakota
 Greenwood Township, Tripp County, South Dakota, in Tripp County, South Dakota

See also
Greenwood (disambiguation)

Township name disambiguation pages